Adda (English: Gossip) is the first feature film by filmmaker Devayush Chowdhary. It has been produced by Maxim Pictures and Reeldrama Productions and released in India on 13 September 2019.

Plot
Adda is a modern-day fable of four interconnected tales of love, friendship, karma, and catharsis. The film is about two naughty angels, Black and White, who come down to Kolkata and spy in on the lives of four jobless friends, an aging freedom fighter, a struggling actress, and a self-righteous journalist in order to decide humanity's fate and in the process become witnesses to our bumbling attempts at happiness.

Cast 
 Soumitra Chatterjee as Dhritimaan Panja, an aging college professor. 
 Sabyasachi Chakraborty as White, the angel of light.
 Dipangshu Acharya as Black, the angel of darkness.
 Saayoni Ghosh as Tanya, a struggling actress.
 Indrasish Roy as Rudro, a successful banker.
 Saurav Das as Satyajit, an NRI filmmaker.
 Ritwika Pal
 Deboprosad Haldar
 Prantik Banerjee
 Jit Das
 Swarnab Banerjee
 Anamika Chakraborty
 Dipanwita Nath
 Sanghasree Sinha
 Nilankur Mukkhopadhyay

Reception 
Adda opened to generally positive reviews  but a tepid response at the box office owing to a lack of big commercial stars and huge publicity. However, the film soon caught on through word of mouth.
Renowned film critic Shoma Chatterji of The Statesman (India)  called the film "An accomplished debut".

The film drew both appreciation and criticism for its stylistic approach which included shaky camera movements, long monologues, and incomplete narrative threads which are all uncommon in Bengali Cinema. The Times of India said it was "not a bad film" and gave it 2.5 stars

Production
The film was originally conceived as a found footage film while the director was still a student at NYU's Tisch School of the Arts. The director Devayush Chowdhary originally conceived the film in 2011 and it took him seven years to write the screenplay. In an interview, he mentioned that because the titular characters Black and White speak in a rhyming tongue of their own, writing rhymes in Bengali was the toughest part for him. By his own admission, the film is inspired by several Hollywood and Bollywood indie films, key amongst them Jim Jarmusch's Coffee and Cigarettes and Kiran Rao's Dhobi Ghat.

References 

2019 films
Indian detective films
Bengali-language Indian films